Betty Louise Van Patter (née Floyd; October 12, 1929 – ), was a bookkeeper for the Black Panther Party, although she herself was white.

Disappearance and discovery of body
Van Patter was aged 45 when, after being missing for five weeks, her body was found. She had been beaten to death. Some sources indicate she had been raped. While no one was ever charged for the crime, it has been suggested that it was committed by members of the party. She had reportedly threatened to make public her discovery that the party doctored its books and had major tax problems.

Biography
After serving as a bookkeeper for Ramparts magazine, Van Patter became an aide to Panther leader Elaine Brown in 1974, after being introduced to the Party by David Horowitz. 

Van Patter went missing on December 13, 1974. Some weeks later, her severely beaten corpse was found on a San Francisco Bay beach.
There was insufficient evidence for police to charge anyone with van Patter's death but the Black Panther Party was "almost universally believed to be responsible," wrote Frank Browning in 1987.  According to other authors, Huey Newton allegedly confessed to a friend that he had ordered Van Patter's murder, and that Van Patter had been tortured and raped before being killed. Christopher Hitchens wrote in the Los Angeles Times in 2003 that: "There is no doubt now, and there was precious little then, of the Panther leadership's complicity in this revolting crime". "While it was true that I had come to dislike Betty Van Patter, I had fired her, not killed her", Elaine Brown wrote in 1993. Brown said Van Patter was fired because she was too nosy about the Black Panther Party and was no longer of use to the party. 

FBI files investigating Van Patter, likely inquiring into her death, have been destroyed for reasons the Bureau has declined to provide.

See also
List of solved missing person cases
List of unsolved murders

References

1970s missing person cases
1974 in California
1974 murders in the United States
December 1974 events in the United States
December 1974 crimes
Black Panther Party
Bookkeepers
Deaths by beating in the United States
Female murder victims
Formerly missing people
Missing person cases in California
Murder in the San Francisco Bay Area
People murdered by African-American organized crime
Unsolved murders in the United States
History of women in California